James (Jim) Chin is a public health epidemiologist. He works in public health surveillance and prevention of communicable diseases, particularly AIDS.

Career
Chin was an international research fellow with the Hooper Foundation, UCSF Medical Center, San Francisco and the Institute for Medical Research, Kuala Lumpur, Malaysia, from 1961–1964, and a research epidemiologist at the California State Viral and Rickettsial Diseases Laboratory, Berkeley and Fort Ord, California from 1964–1967.

He served as head of the general epidemiology unit, Bureau of Communicable Disease Control, California State Department of Health Services, Berkeley, from 1968–1971 and was chief of their infectious disease section from 1971–1987.

He has studied the AIDS pandemic from the early 1980s in California, where he was responsible for surveillance and control of communicable diseases, to the late 1980s at the World Health Organization in Geneva, Switzerland, where he was responsible for developing the methods and guidelines for global and regional HIV/AIDS surveillance. He worked as chief of the surveillance, forecasting and impact assessment unit (SFI) of the Global Programme on AIDS, World Health Organization, Geneva, Switzerland from 1987–1992.

Since his resignation from GPA/WHO in 1992, he has worked as an independent consultant for different international agencies to evaluate the patterns and prevalence of HIV in developing countries, primarily in Africa and Asia. Some international agencies he has worked with include UNAIDS, WHO, Asian Development Bank, World Bank, USAID, and DFID.

He was a clinical professor of epidemiology at the School of Public Health, University of California at Berkeley, from 1992 until 2009 when he retired from active teaching.

Memberships and board positions
During his public health career, Chin has held leadership positions at state, national, and international organizations and received recognition for his work as an infectious disease epidemiologist.
 Elected member, American Epidemiological Society (AES), 1973
 President, Conference of State and Territorial Epidemiologists (CSTE), 1977–1978
 Chairman, National Advisory Committee on Immunization Practices (ACIP), 1982–1985
 Member, Armed Forces Epidemiologic Board (AFEB), 1977–1983 and 1993–1998
 Member, Advisory Council for Public Health Preparedness (An Advisory Council to the Secretary of HHS, 2001–2004)

Literary career
 Section editor (Communicable Diseases) for the 11th [1980] and 12th [1986] editions of Maxcy-Rosenau Public Health and Preventive Medicine (John Last, editor) Appleton-Century Crofts, New York
 Associate editor for the 14th (1985) and 15th (1990) edition of the American Public Health Association (APHA) Control of Communicable Diseases Manual (CCDM)
 Editor, 17th edition (2000) of the APHA's Control of Communicable Diseases Manual (CCDM).
He was a member of the editorial board in the early 1970s.  Hundreds of international specialists in infectious disease have contributed to updating the entries. Abram Salmon Benenson was the editor for so long (from 1970 to 1995) that the manual was often known as "Benenson's book".
 Author, The AIDS Pandemic: The Collision of Epidemiology with Political Correctness (January 2007, Radcliffe Publishing Ltd.)

Awards
Chin was recipient of the John Snow award in 1993 for career contributions to public health epidemiology from the APHA Epidemiology Section.

References

External links
 UC Berkeley School of Public Health – Faculty

Year of birth missing (living people)
Living people
American epidemiologists
HIV/AIDS researchers
UC Berkeley School of Public Health faculty